Homesick Heroes is the fifteenth studio album by Charlie Daniels and the twelfth as the Charlie Daniels Band, released on August 15, 1988. The album is known for the band's cover of the Jimmy Dean classic, "Big Bad John," which also includes guest harmony vocals by The Oak Ridge Boys, and for the song "Uneasy Rider '88" which is musically and thematically similar to their renowned 1973 song "Uneasy Rider" but with a story set in a Houston, Texas gay bar.

Track listing 
All songs written by the Charlie Daniels Band (Charlie Daniels, Tom Crain, Taz DiGregorio, Charles Hayward & Jack Gavin), except where noted:

 "Boogie Woogie Fiddle Country Blues" - 3:2:
 "Alligator"  - 3:51
 "Get Me Back to Dixie" (Crain, Rick Rentz) - 3:07
 "Boogie Woogie Man" - 3:52
 "Cowboy Hat in Dallas" - 4:29
 "Big Bad John" (featuring The Oak Ridge Boys) (Jimmy Dean, Roy Acuff) - 3:37
 "Midnight Train" - 4:19
 "Honky Tonk Avenue" - 3:36
 "You Can't Pick Cotton" - 3:51
 "Ill Wind" - 3:35
 "Uneasy Rider '88" - 4:25

Personnel
 Charlie Daniels - banjo, fiddle, mandolin, guitar, lead vocals
 Tom Crain - guitar, background vocals
 Taz DiGregorio - keyboards, background vocals
 Charlie Hayward - bass guitar
 Jack Gavin - drums, percussion
 The Oak Ridge Boys - background vocals on "Big Bad John"
 James Stroud - percussion, background vocals

Charts

Weekly charts

Year-end charts

References

1988 albums
Charlie Daniels albums
Albums produced by James Stroud
Epic Records albums